Robinson, formerly Expedition Robinson, is a Swedish reality game show and the original version of the international Survivor format.

The television show places a group of strangers in an isolated location, where they must provide food, fire, and shelter for themselves. They are initially divided into two tribes. The contestants compete in challenges for rewards and immunity from elimination. The remaining contestants are eventually merged into a single tribe. The contestants are progressively eliminated from the game as they are voted out by their fellow contestants or, as may be the result after the merge, lose an immunity challenge until only one remains and is awarded the grand prize.

The format was developed in 1994 by Charlie Parsons for a United Kingdom TV production company called Planet 24, but the Swedish debut in 1997 was the first production to actually make it to television. The show was a success, and plans for international versions were made. An American version called Survivor started in 2000.

Format
The name alludes to both Robinson Crusoe and The Swiss Family Robinson, two stories featuring people marooned by shipwrecks.

12–20 contestants are put into a survival situation and compete in a variety of physical challenges. Early in each season two teams compete but later on the teams are merged and the competitions become individual. Contestants are eliminated through tribal councils and, after merging, losing immunity challenges until the final challenge where the winner wins the competition.

Ownership
Planet 24 was owned by Charlie Parsons and Bob Geldof. Their company Castaway Television Productions retained the rights to the concept when they sold Planet 24 in 1999. In July 2017, Banijay Group acquired Castaway Television Productions.

Seasons

Notes

References
Footnotes

Sources

Further reading

External links
 
 Expedition Robinson at Aftonbladet 
 Official Strix site
Salon article
 
 

 
1997 Swedish television series debuts
Sveriges Television original programming
TV3 (Sweden) original programming
TV4 (Sweden) original programming
Swedish reality television series
Survivor (franchise)
1990s Swedish television series
2000s Swedish television series
2010s Swedish television series